Sporting Life is a 1925 American silent comedy drama film directed by Maurice Tourneur and a remake of Tourneur's 1918 film of the same title based on Seymour Hicks's popular play. Universal Pictures produced and released the film.

Plot
As described in a film magazine review, Lord Woodstock loses money as the backer of a musical show and hopes to recoup his losses by betting on his protégé, Joe Lee, a pugilist, and by winning the Derby with his horse, Lady Love. Olive Carteret, an actress, tries to win Woodstock, but he is in love with Nora, the daughter of his trainer. Olive conspires with Phillips, a gambler, to break him. On the night of the fight Lee is drugged. Woodstock takes his place in the ring and wins. Phillips kidnaps Nora, and Woodstock and Lee are imprisoned when they go to the rescue. They escape shortly before the race, but Lee is killed. Lady Love wins the race, and after Phillips is arrested for Lee’s murder, Woodstock and Nora are free to marry.

Cast

Preservation
Once thought lost, a print of Sporting Life survives at UCLA Film and Television Archive.

References

External links

Lobby poster The Sporting Life

1925 films
American silent feature films
Films directed by Maurice Tourneur
1920s rediscovered films
Films set in England
Films set in London
American films based on plays
1925 comedy-drama films
Universal Pictures films
American black-and-white films
Rediscovered American films
1920s American films
Silent American comedy-drama films
1920s English-language films